The 2001 Mountain West Conference baseball tournament took place from May 16 through 19. This was the second tournament held by the league. All six of the league's teams met in the double-elimination tournament held at San Diego State University's Tony Gwynn Stadium. Top seeded BYU won their first Mountain West Conference Baseball Championship with a championship game score of 4–3 and earned the conference's new automatic bid to the 2001 NCAA Division I baseball tournament.

Seeding 
The teams were seeded based on regular season conference winning percentage only. Utah claimed the third seed over New Mexico by winning the season series.

Results

All-Tournament Team 
The following teams were named to the All-Tournament team.

Most Valuable Player 
Nate Fernley, a pitcher for the champion BYU Cougars, was named the tournament Most Valuable Player after his complete game victory in the championship game.

References 

Tournament
Mountain West Conference baseball tournament
Mountain West Conference baseball tournament
Mountain West Conference baseball tournament
Baseball competitions in San Diego
College baseball tournaments in California